"Ryusei" (stylized as R.Y.U.S.E.I.) is a song recorded by Japanese group Sandaime J Soul Brothers from Exile Tribe. It was released on June 25, 2014 by rhythm zone and later included in his fifth studio album Planet Seven (2015). Musically, "Ryusei" it is a J-pop song with an EDM beat. Upon its release, it peaked at number one on the Oricon Singles Chart and due to its commercial success, topped the Billboard Japan Hot 100 of the Year 2015.

Music Video
The music video for "Ryusei" was filmed in Los Angeles, United States. On September 3, 2016, the number of views of the music video on YouTube exceeded 100 million, being the first video ever of Avex's YouTube channel to do so.

Track listings and formats
Digital download
 "Ryusei" – 5:24
 "Summer Dreams Come True" – 4:07
 "Wedding Bell: "  – 4:59

CD single
 "Ryusei" – 5:24
 "Summer Dreams Come True" – 4:07
 "Wedding Bell: " – 4:59
 "Ryusei" (instrumental) – 5:24
 "Summer Dreams Come True" (instrumental) – 4:07
 "Wedding Bell: " (instrumental) – 4:59

DVD
 "Ryusei" (music video)

Charts

Weekly charts

Year-end charts

Certifications

Awards

References 

2014 singles
2014 songs
J-pop songs
Electronic dance music songs
Oricon Weekly number-one singles
Billboard Japan Hot 100 number-one singles
Rhythm Zone singles
Sandaime J Soul Brothers songs